Tubaria moseri is a species of agaric fungus in the family Tubariaceae. Found in Argentina, it was described as new to science in 1974 by Jörg H. Raithelhuber. The specific epithet moseri honours Austrian mycologist Meinhard Moser.

References

External links

Tubariaceae
Fungi described in 1974
Fungi of Argentina